Spanistoneura is a genus of moths belonging to the subfamily Olethreutinae of the family Tortricidae.

Species
Spanistoneura acrospodia Diakonoff, 1982

See also
List of Tortricidae genera

References

External links
tortricidae.com

Grapholitini
Tortricidae genera
Taxa named by Alexey Diakonoff